Dangram (Pashto: دنګرام) is an administrative unit, known as Village Council in Union Council or Ward Dangram in Tehsil Babuzai, of Swat District in the Khyber Pakhtunkhwa province of Pakistan.

According to Khyber Pakhtunkhwa Local Government Act 2013. District Swat has 214 Wards, of which total amount of Village Councils is 170, and Neighborhood is 44.

According to Election Commission of Pakistan, Dangram consists of:
 PC Mingora (Mauza Dangram)

Population of Village Council Dangram is 5229, and no of General Seats in Local Bodies Election is 7.

See also 
 Dangram
 Babuzai
 Swat District

References

External links
 Khyber-Pakhtunkhwa Government website section on Lower Dir
 United Nations
 Hajjinfo.org Uploads
 PBS paiman.jsi.com
 Neighbourhood Council 

Swat District
Populated places in Swat District
Union councils of Khyber Pakhtunkhwa
Union Councils of Swat District